Quiero Más is the third album by the Mexican singer Patricia Manterola.

Track listing

References

1998 albums
Patricia Manterola albums